Fowl Weather is a 1953 Warner Bros. Merrie Melodies animated short directed by Friz Freleng. The short was released on April 4, 1953, and features Tweety and Sylvester.

Plot

See also
 List of cartoons featuring Sylvester

References

1953 short films
1953 animated films
1950s English-language films
1950s Warner Bros. animated short films
American animated short films
Merrie Melodies short films
Sylvester the Cat films
Tweety films
Animated films about dogs
Films about cattle
Animated films about pigs
Animated films about chickens
Films set on farms
Films set in 1953
Short films directed by Friz Freleng
Films scored by Carl Stalling
Warner Bros. Cartoons animated short films